Madine is a surname. Notable people with the surname include:

Gary Madine (born 1990), English footballer
Marion Madine (born 1970), Irish swimmer
Thelma Madine (born 1953), British wedding dressmaker

See also
Maine (surname)
Marine (given name)
Nadine (given name)